Sours may refer to:
Sour (cocktail), a family of classical mixed drinks
Sour beer, a beer with a tart or sour taste
Fruit sours, a type of confectionery